Callovosaurus (meaning "Callovian lizard") is a genus of iguanodontian dinosaur known from most of a left thigh bone discovered in Middle Jurassic-age rocks of England. At times, it has been considered dubious or a valid genus of basal iguanodontian, perhaps a dryosaurid.

History and description

Callovosaurus is based on BMNH R1993, a nearly complete left thigh bone. This specimen was collected from the middle Callovian–age (Middle Jurassic) Peterborough Member (former Lower Oxford Clay) of the Oxford Clay Formation of Fletton, near Peterborough in Cambridgeshire, England. A partial shin bone from the same site or nearby, SMC J.46889, may also belong to Callovosaurus.

The type species, C. leedsi, was first described by Richard Lydekker in 1889 as Camptosaurus leedsi, the specific name honouring collector Alfred Nicholson Leeds. Aside from Charles W. Gilmore suggesting in 1909 that it was probably more closely related to Dryosaurus than to Camptosaurus, Camptosaurus leedsi attracted little attention for decades until it was reviewed by Peter Galton. First noting its distinctiveness in a review of English hypsilophodontids, he then gave the species the new genus Callovosaurus in 1980, which he placed in Camptosauridae. While considered a dubious iguanodontian in several reviews, which refer to it as "Camptosaurus" leedsi, Jose Ignacio Ruiz-Omeñaca and coauthors have proposed that Callovosaurus is a valid genus, and the oldest known dryosaurid.

Palaeoecology
Callovosaurus was found in the lower Oxford Clay, which has yielded a diverse reptile assemblage: ichthyosaurs, plesiosaurs, crocodyliforms, pterosaurs, sauropod dinosaurs, the stegosaurids Loricatosaurus and the dubious Lexovisaurus, and the armoured dinosaur Sarcolestes. These rocks were once thought to be somewhat younger, from the Oxfordian of the Late Jurassic, but they are now known to be middle Callovian in age.

The diet of Callovosaurus, like that of other iguanodontians, was plant material. It is one of the earliest known members of the iguanodontian lineage.

References

External links
Callovosaurus in The Paleobiology Database

Iguanodonts
Ornithischian genera
Callovian genera
Middle Jurassic dinosaurs of Europe
Jurassic England
Fossils of England
Oxford Clay
Fossil taxa described in 1980
Taxa named by Peter Galton